The 2013 Hwaebul Cup was the inaugural edition of the Hwaebul Cup (홰불, Torch) celebrating North Korea's Youth Day. The competition was held between 15 and 28 August 2013, with all matches played at the Kim Il-sung Stadium in P'yŏngyang. The competition was arranged in two phases, a group stage followed by a single-elimination play-off semi-finals, and a single-game final.

Round and dates

Group stage
Eleven teams took part in the group stage, drawn into two groups, with five teams in Group A and six in Group B.

Group A

Group B

Starting 11s:
 Kigwancha: 18 Kim Il-gwang (gk); 15 Pang Tae-gun, 25 Ryu Kum-chol, 3 Kang Kuk-chol, 6 U Il-gang, 5 Ri Tong-il , 7 Kim Yong-il, 17 Choe Kwang-hyok, 11 Kim Ji-song, 9 Jang Ok-chol, 19 Han Tae-hyok; manager: Ko Jong-nam
 Wolmido: 1 Pyo Kuk-chol (gk); 11 Im Yong-chol, 4 Kang Hyon-su, 17 Rim Hyok-ju, 22 Cha Sang-chol, 15 Un Yong-il, 18 Ro Myong-il, 14 Kim Kyong-hol, 8 Ri Kum-chol, 7 Hyon Jin-hyok, 16 Ri Kum-song; manager: Pak Jong-chol

Starting 11s:
 Sŏnbong: 1 Om Jin-ho (gk); 18 Ri Yong-ha, 3 Song Chol-un, 4 Rim Song, 14 Kim Song-hak, 7 Yun Hyok-chol , 6 Ri Un-chol, 17 Kang In-su, 8 Pae Myong-jin, 28 Paek Chol-jin, 15 Ho Myong-chol; manager: O Tae-song;  19 Choe Jin-hyok,  11 Jang Ok-il
 Rimyŏngsu: 1 Ri Chol-jin (gk); 3 Ri Myong-hak, 16 Kim Ju-hyok, 20 Ro Hak-su, 2 Jang Kwang-hyok, 9 Pak Song-chol, 12 Jo Jong-chol, 13 Yang Jun-hyok, 8 Ri Hyok, 11 Pak Chol-min, 7 Kim Kyong-il; manager: Kim Myong-song

Semi-finals
The semi-final matches were both held on the same day, probably 26 August 2013. The result of the Sŏnbong–Hwaebul match is unknown; in the other match, April 25 defeated Amrokkang 3-1 on penalties after finishing level at 2-2 after extra time.

Final
The final was held on 28 August 2013 at Kim Il-sung Stadium. The score was even at 2-2 after extra time, and Sŏnbong won 6-5 on penalties. However, a few days after the match, Sŏnbong was deemed to have fielded an ineligible player, and April 25 were awarded the victory. In addition to being stripped of the title, Sŏnbong were suspended from all competitions for six months.

External links
The final between April 25 and Sŏnbong

References

DPR Korea Football League seasons
1
Korea
Korea
Hwaebul Cup